Kothapeta may refer to:

Kothapet, Hyderabad, a locality in Hyderabad
Kothapeta, Konaseema, a village in Dr. B.R. Ambedkar Konaseema district, Andhra Pradesh, India
Kothapeta (Assembly constituency), a constituency in the Andhra Pradesh Legislative Assembly
Kothapeta, Telangana, a village in Warangal District